Bodypop is the ninth studio album by German synthpop group And One, released in September 2006 by Out of Line records. It was produced by singer Steve Naghavi. The album peaked at #1 on the German Alternative Charts (DAC) and ranked #12 on the DAC Top 50 Albums of 2006.

Overall, the album features a more polished synthpop sound than the previous record. Also unlike its predecessor, it contains English songs as well as German. Some releases came with the Frontfeuer EP, which featured an extra five studio tracks. This EP was released on its own on December 5, 2006.

"Military Fashion Show", "So Klingt Liebe" and "Traumfrau" were released as singles. "Military Fashion Show" peaked at #1 on the DAC Singles charts while "So Klingt Liebe" peaked at #3.

Track listing

Bodypop 

 "Mein Anfang" - 2:18
 "Military Fashion Show" - 4:28
 "Enjoy the Unknown" - 5:21
 "So Klingt Liebe" - 3:46
 "The Sound of Believer" - 4:22
 "Body Company" - 5:23
 "Traumfrau" - 6:24
 "Stand the Pain" - 4:24
 "Sexkeit" - 4:03
 "Love You to the End" - 5:09
 "The Dream" - 6:32
 "Dein Ende" - 6:26

Frontfeuer 

 "Rearming Strafbomber" - 4:50
 "Master Master " - 3:41
 "A Kind of Deutsch" - 3:51
 "Steine Sind Steine" - 4:01
 "The Force" - 3:12

Other tracks

"Beauty Clown" - b-side to "Military Fashion Show"
"Computer Star" - b-side to "Military Fashion Show"
"Hardware Conflict" - b-side to "So Klingt Liebe" (S)
"Tell Me Lies" - b-side to "So Klingt Liebe" (E)
"Schmerzengel" - b-side to "So Klingt Liebe" (X)
"Naghavigationssystem" - b-side to "Traumfrau"
"Tonight" - b-side to "Traumfrau"

References

http://www.discogs.com/And-One-Bodypop/master/13001http://www.discogs.com/And-One-Frontfeuer/release/838034

2006 albums
And One albums